Edmund Miller (1669– 1 August 1730) was an MP for Petersfield during the first half of the 18th century.

Miller was born at Marsworth, the son of John Miller and Bridget née West. He was educated at Eton College and Trinity College, Cambridge. He was elected a Fellow of Trinity in 1692. He studied at Lincoln's Inn, migrated to The Temple and was called to the bar in 1699.

References

People from Buckinghamshire
People educated at Eton College
Alumni of Trinity College, Cambridge
British MPs 1722–1727
1669 births
1730 deaths